Simon Power may refer to:
Simon Power (composer) (born 1958), English composer and sound designer
Simon Power (politician) (born 1969), New Zealand politician
Simon Power (footballer) (born 1998), Irish footballer